Baldur  is the début full-length album by the Icelandic Viking / folk metal band Skálmöld. It was first released in Iceland and the Faeroe Islands on December 15, 2010 through Tutl and re-released by Napalm Records worldwide in July – August 2011.

Background
While Skálmöld was initially formed with intention to be just a hobby, the band members soon decided to record an album. In January 2010, the band recorded its first demo, consisting of two song, "Árás" and "Kvaðning", but it was never released. In May 2010, Skálmöld entered Studio Reflex in Reykjavík to record its first album.

Music
Baldur is a concept album, telling a story of a fictional eponymous Viking with lyrics inspired by the Icelandic sagas and Norse mythology, entirely in Icelandic. A demon-like creature attacks Baldur's home and kills his wife and children, forcing him on a quest for revenge, aided by two friends. After much hardship, they fight their enemy. Baldur's friends die in the final battle and, having defeated the enemy, he succumbs to his wounds as well, joining his family in Valhalla. For the album's re-release, the band decided to record a bonus track, "Baldur", which proved to be challenging, since it had to supplement the completed story line.

Baldur's lyrics conform to the rules of dróttkvætt, the Old Norse alliterative verse, while music combines folk melodies, with the elements from melodic death, doom and thrash metal, creating an overall epic atmosphere.

The album and protagonist were named after Baldur Ragnarsson, guitarist with the band and brother of main songwriter Snæbjörn. Snæbjörn likes to use names for the characters which are familiar to him and to which he has some connection.

Track listing

Credits
 Björgvin Sigurðsson – vocals, guitar
 Baldur Ragnarsson – guitar
 Snæbjörn Ragnarsson – bass
 Þráinn Árni Baldvinsson – guitar
 Gunnar Ben – keyboards, oboe
 Jón Geir Jóhannsson – drums
 Aðalbjörn Tryggvason (Sólstafir) – guest vocals on "Hefnd" and "Árás"

References

External links

2010 albums
Skálmöld albums
Napalm Records albums